Kousba is a village in Koura District, in the Northern Governorate of Lebanon. The population are  Greek Orthodox.

History
According to the elderly residents of this town, the name Kousba comes from the word "Hidden" because of how it lies between mountains. Kousba is one of the most inhabited villages in the Koura district. It is situated at 18 km south of Tripoli, and 12 km east of Chekka. A main road that runs from Chekka to Bsharri (called "Chekka Arz Highway") passes through Kousba.

Basics
Kousba has a population of about 5,000 residents. It has two public schools with 311 students enrolled in each of them. Statistics from the 2004 municipal elections indicate that Kousba has 7,193 registered voters—of which 4,940 voted. Kousba has 23 companies with more than 5 employees. Kousba has one medical center but no hospitals. This town consists of 601 Hectares of land. Many landmarks exist in Kousba including ancient historical monuments, touristic attractions, religious sites, sports clubs, teaching institutions and social clubs.

Businesses in Kousba
Banks, Computer shops, Computer Services (IT), Supermarkets, Jewelries, Car Mechanics, Olive Oils, Perfumeries, Wheels repairs, Lingeries, Clothing, Flowers, Photographing, Silver ware, Ice Creams and Sweets, Car Spare Parts, Buchers, Shoe Shops, Blinds and Curtains Shops, Gas Stations, Eye Glasses, Mobile Phone Shops, Construction Materials, Hair Dressers, Bookshops, Beauty shops and Pharmacies.

Families in Kousba
Andraous, Abdullah, Antoun, Atieh, Awad, Ayoub, Azar, Bchara, Braheem, Dannawi, Fadil, Farrah, Fayad, Ghazi, Gosen, Greij, Habib, Hakeem, Hanna, Haykal, Ibrahim, Isaac, Israel, Jabbour, Kamar, Kanaan, Kheir, Khoury, Manssour, Mitri, Moussa, Namey, Nasr, Nassar, Nahas, Rihana, Roumi, Saab, Saba, Saddic, Sarkis, Sarraf, Sassine, El-Tom, Wakeem, Yacoub, Younis, Youssef, Zaidan and El Zalameh .

References

External links
Kousba, Localiban  (in English)
 Kousba, Localiban  (in French)
 http://www.kousba.org
 http://www.kousba.gov.lb
 http://www.hamatoura.com/

Eastern Orthodox Christian communities in Lebanon
Koura District
Populated places in the North Governorate